

Imperial German Navy seaplane number 947 was a reconnaissance aircraft produced during the First World War, the sole example of its type. It was one of only three armed aircraft built by the Kaiserliche Werft Wilhelmshaven amongst a variety of trainer seaplanes that they had produced for the Navy during the course of the war. Number 947 was a two-bay biplane of conventional design, with twin pontoon undercarriage, and two open cockpits in tandem. It received the Naval classification CHFT, indicating an armed aircraft equipped with radio gear capable of both sending and receiving.

The design bore a resemblance to a pair of trainer seaplanes produced at Wilhelmshaven (Nos 461–462) and to a design from Kaiserliche Werft Kiel (Nos 463–466), and all three designs could have been the work of the same designer or designers. The machine was evaluated by the seaplane testing unit (SVK – Seeflugzeug-Versuchskommando) at Warnemünde at some point, but the records that have survived are somewhat contradictory. In any case, no further examples were constructed.

Specifications

Notes

References
 

 
 

1910s German military reconnaissance aircraft
947
Floatplanes
Single-engined tractor aircraft
Biplanes
Aircraft first flown in 1916